The Dreamland Egypt Classic is a defunct WTA Tour affiliated tennis tournament played in 1999. It was held in Cairo in Egypt and played on outdoor clay courts. According to the Al-Ahram newspaper, Dreamland Egypt Classic was the first WTA tournament ever held in Middle East.

Past finals

Singles

Doubles

References

External links 
 WTA Results Archive

 
Clay court tennis tournaments
Tennis tournaments in Egypt
Sports competitions in Cairo
WTA Tour
1999 in tennis
1999 in Egyptian sport